Zach Miller may refer to:

Zach Miller (tight end, born 1984), NFL tight end for the Jacksonville Jaguars, Tampa Bay Buccaneers, and Chicago Bears
Zach Miller (tight end, born 1985), former NFL tight end for the Oakland Raiders and Seattle Seahawks